Patrick K. Gamble (born November 12, 1945)
is a retired president of the University of Alaska and a retired United States Air Force (USAF) general whose assignments included service as Commander, Pacific Air Forces, Hickam Air Force Base, Hawaii.

Gamble entered the USAF in 1967 through the four-year Reserve Officer Training Corps program at Texas A&M University. He flew 394 combat missions as a forward air controller in the O-1 Bird Dog during the Vietnam War. He has commanded a fighter squadron and three wings. Before assuming his current position, he was deputy chief of staff for air and space operations, Headquarters U.S. Air Force, the Pentagon, Washington, D.C. He retired from the USAF on May 1, 2001.

Following his service in the Air Force, Gamble became a senior executive for the Alaska Railroad, where he succeeded Bill Sheffield as president of the railroad.  In 2010, he retired from the railroad and accepted appointment as president of the University of Alaska, succeeding Mark R. Hamilton, himself a retired U.S. Army general. In December 2014 Gamble announced his resignation from the University of Alaska and he was succeeded in September 2015 by Jim Johnsen.

Education
1967 Bachelor of Arts degree in mathematics, Texas A&M University, College Station
1978 Air Command and Staff College, Maxwell Air Force Base, Alabama
1978 Master of business administration and management degree, Auburn University, Auburn, Alabama
1984 Distinguished graduate, Air War College, Maxwell Air Force Base, Alabama

Assignments
December 1967 – January 1969, student, undergraduate pilot training, Randolph Air Force Base, Texas
February 1969 – April 1969, forward air controller training, Hurlburt Field, Florida
May 1969 – May 1970, forward air controller, O-1 Bird Dog, Duc Hoa Village, South Vietnam
May 1970 – November 1970, student, F-102 Delta Dagger interceptor training, Perrin Air Force Base, Texas
November 1970 – January 1971, F-106 Delta Dart upgrade pilot training, Tyndall Air Force Base, Florida
February 1971 – January 1974, life support officer, F-106 instructor pilot and flight commander, 460th Fighter Interceptor Squadron, Grand Forks Air Force Base, North Dakota
January 1974 – January 1975, Air Staff Training Assignment, Directorate of Personnel Programs, Headquarters U.S. Air Force, the Pentagon, Washington, D.C.
January 1975 – July 1977, chief of standardization and evaluation, 87th Fighter Interceptor Squadron, K.I. Sawyer Air Force Base, Michigan
August 1977 – July 1978, student, Air Command and Staff College, Maxwell Air Force Base, Alabama
July 1978 – May 1981, chief, Air Threat Analysis Group (Red Team), Project Checkmate, Directorate of Operations and Readiness, Headquarters U.S. Air Force, the Pentagon, Washington, D.C.
May 1981 – June 1983, commander, 318th Fighter Interceptor Squadron, McChord Air Force Base, Washington
July 1983 – June 1984, student, Air War College, Maxwell Air Force Base, Alabama
June 1984 – July 1986, chief, Operations Management and Analysis Division; chief, Contingency Plans Division; deputy director, then director, Personnel Plans and Systems, Headquarters Tactical Air Command, Langley Air Force Base, Virginia
July 1986 – April 1988, director of operations, then vice commander, 474th Tactical Fighter Wing, Nellis Air Force Base, Nevada
April 1988 – June 1989, commander, 18th Combat Support Wing, Kadena Air Base, Japan
June 1989 – June 1990, commander, 8th Tactical Fighter Wing, Kunsan Air Base, South Korea
June 1990 – June 1992, executive officer to the Air Force chief of staff, Headquarters U.S. Air Force, the Pentagon, Washington, D.C.
August 1992 – June 1993, commander, 58th Fighter Wing, Luke Air Force Base, Arizona
June 1993 – November 1994, commandant of cadets and commander, 34th Training Wing, U.S. Air Force Academy, Colorado Springs, Colorado
November 1994 – August 1996, assistant chief of staff, Operations and Logistics Division, Supreme Headquarters Allied Powers Europe, Belgium
August 1996 – November 1997, commander, Alaskan Command, Alaskan North American Aerospace Defense Command Region, 11th Air Force and Joint Task Force-Alaska, Elmendorf Air Force Base, Alaska
November 1997 – July 1998, deputy chief of staff, Air and Space Operations, Headquarters U.S. Air Force, the Pentagon, Washington, D.C.
July 1998 – 2001, commander, Pacific Air Forces, Hickam Air Force Base, Hawaii

Flight information
Rating: Command pilot
Flight hours: More than 3,100
Aircraft flown: O-1, F-102, F-106, F-16A/C and F-15C

Major awards and decorations
  Defense Distinguished Service Medal with oak leaf cluster
  Air Force Distinguished Service Medal with oak leaf cluster
  Legion of Merit
  Distinguished Flying Cross
  Meritorious Service Medal with two oak leaf clusters
  Air Medal with 13 oak leaf clusters
  Air Force Commendation Medal
  Army Presidential Unit Citation with oak leaf cluster
  Air Force Outstanding Unit Award with "V" device and three oak leaf clusters
  Vietnam Service Medal with three service stars
  Republic of Vietnam Gallantry Cross with service star
  Republic of Vietnam Staff Service Honor Medal First Class
  Republic of Vietnam Gallantry Cross with Palm
NATO Medal

Other achievements
1976 Member, William Tell Air-to-Air Weapons Competition Team, 87th Fighter Interceptor Squadron
1982 Team leader, William Tell Air-to-Air Competition Team, 318th Fighter Interceptor Squadron

Effective dates of promotion
Second Lieutenant December 13, 1967
First Lieutenant June 13, 1969
Captain December 13, 1970
Major June 1, 1976
Lieutenant Colonel September 1, 1980
Colonel September 1, 1985
Brigadier General November 1, 1991
Major General September 28, 1994
Lieutenant General September 1, 1996
General October 1, 1998

References

1945 births
Living people
People from Fresno, California
Military personnel from California
United States Air Force personnel of the Vietnam War
21st-century American railroad executives
Auburn University alumni
Presidents of the University of Alaska System
Recipients of the Air Medal
Recipients of the Distinguished Flying Cross (United States)
Recipients of the Legion of Merit
Recipients of the Order of the Sword (United States)
Texas A&M University alumni
United States Air Force generals
Recipients of the Defense Distinguished Service Medal
Recipients of the Air Force Distinguished Service Medal